Beijing Municipal Bureau of Culture is an agency of the Beijing government which sets policies and laws relating to the arts and Chinese culture, implementing plans for the cultural development of the city. The agency is responsible for the management of the cultural market and its development in Beijing. 

It operates the city's public libraries by guiding the collection and use of Books and promoting literature resources, along with the distribution of movies, audio products and other forms of entertainment.

References

External links
 Beijing Municipal Bureau of Culture 

Politics of Beijing